Trinidad and Tobago competed at the 1984 Summer Olympics in Los Angeles, United States. Sixteen competitors, eleven men and five women, took part in fourteen events in five sports.

Athletics

Men's 100 metres
 Hasely Crawford 
 Heat — 10.48q (Heat 1, 4th place)
 Quarterfinals — 10.56 (QF 1, 4th place→ did not advance)

Men's 400 metres 
 Michael Paul  
 Heat — 46.18
 Quarterfinals — 45.84
 Semifinals — 45.60 (→ did not advance)

 Anton Skerritt  
 Heat — 46.30
 Quarterfinals — 46.93 (→ did not advance)

 Ali St. Louis   
 Heat — did not finish (→ did not advance)

Men's 4×400 metres Relay
 Anton Skerritt, Michael Puckerin, Derek Archer, and Michael Paul

Women's 100 metres
 Gillian Forde
 Angela Williams

Women's 200 metres
 Angela Williams

Women's 400 metres
 Gail Emmanuel

Women's 4×100 metres Relay
 Janice Bernard, Gillian Forde, Esther Hope-Washington, and Angela Williams

Boxing

Men's Featherweight
 Nirmal Lorick

Men's Light-Heavyweight
 Don Smith

Cycling

One cyclist represented Trinidad and Tobago in 1984.

Sprint
 Gene Samuel

1000m time trial
 Gene Samuel

Sailing

Mixed One Person Dinghy
 Jean-Marc Holder

Swimming

Men's 100m Breaststroke
 Paul Newallo
 Heat — 1:06.12 (→ did not advance, 28th place)

Men's 200m Breaststroke
 Paul Newallo
 Heat — 2:28.88 (→ did not advance, 32nd place)

References

External links
 Official Olympic Reports
 International Olympic Committee results database

Nations at the 1984 Summer Olympics
1984
Summer Olympics